Rex Warner (9 March 1905 – 24 June 1986) was an English classicist, writer, and translator. He is now probably best remembered for The Aerodrome (1941). Warner was described by V. S. Pritchett as "the only outstanding novelist of ideas whom the decade of ideas produced".

Biographical sketch

He was born Reginald Ernest Warner in Birmingham, England, and brought up mainly in Gloucestershire, where his father was a clergyman. He was educated at St. George's School in Harpenden and at Wadham College, Oxford, where he associated with W. H. Auden, Cecil Day-Lewis, and Stephen Spender and published in Oxford Poetry. He obtained a 1st in Classical Moderations in 1925 and later graduated with a 3rd in English in 1928. He then spent time teaching, some of it in Egypt.

Warner's debut story, "Holiday", appeared in the New Statesman in 1930. His first collection, Poems, appeared in 1937. His poem, "Arms in Spain", a satire on German and Italian support for the Spanish Nationalists, has often been reprinted. He was also a contributor to Left Review. Warner was a great admirer of Franz Kafka and his fiction was "profoundly influenced" by Kafka's work. Warner's first three novels all reflect his anti-fascist beliefs; The Wild Goose Chase is in part a dystopian fantasy about the overthrow of a tyrannical government in a heroic revolution. His second novel, The Professor, published around the time of the Nazi Anschluss, is the story of a liberal academic whose compromises with a repressive government lead eventually to his arrest, imprisonment and murder "while attempting to escape". Contemporary reviewers saw parallels with the Austrian leaders Engelbert Dollfuss and Kurt Schuschnigg.

Although Warner was initially sympathetic to the Soviet Union, "the Molotov–Ribbentrop Pact left him disillusioned with Communism". The Aerodrome is an allegorical novel whose young hero is faced with the disintegration of his certainties about his loved ones, and with a choice between the earthy, animalistic life of his home village and the pure, efficient, emotionally detached life of an airman. The Times described The Aerodrome as Warner's "most perfectly accomplished novel".
Why Was I Killed? (1943) is an afterlife fantasy with an anti-war theme.

Warner then abandoned contemporary allegory in favour of historical novels about Ancient Greece and Rome, including Imperial Caesar, for which he was awarded the 1960 James Tait Black Memorial Prize for fiction. Imperial Caesar was praised by John Davenport as "delightfully perceptive and funny", and by Storm Jameson as "brilliant, intelligent, continuously interesting. It has everything." The Converts, a novel about Saint Augustine, reflected Warner's own increasing devotion to Christianity. He dedicated it to the Greek poet and diplomat George Seferis.

Warner served in the Home Guard during the Second World War and also worked as a Latin teacher at a Grammar School in Morden as there was a shortage of teachers. From 1945 to 1947 he was in Athens as Director of the British Institute. At that time he became involved in numerous translations of classical Greek and Latin authors. His translation of Thucydides' History of the Peloponnesian War for Penguin Classics sold over a million copies. He also translated Poems of George Seferis (1960).

Warner's time in Greece coincided with the early stages of the Greek Civil War, which ended with the Greek Communists defeated and suppressed. This formed the background to his book "Men of Stones: A Melodrama" (1949), depicting imprisoned leftists presenting King Lear in their prison camp.

In 1961 Warner was appointed Tallman Professor of Classics at Bowdoin College and from 1962 to 1973 he was a professor at the University of Connecticut. While he was in the United States he was interviewed for the book Authors Take Sides on Vietnam (1967) and argued for withdrawal from Indochina.

Rex Warner retired to England in 1973 and died in Wallingford, Oxfordshire.

Personal life
Warner was married three times, but to only two women. His first marriage was to Frances Chamier Grove, in 1929. Their marriage ended in divorce and in 1949 Warner married Barbara, Lady Rothschild, formerly the wife of Baron Victor Rothschild. After his second divorce, in 1966, he remarried his first wife. Warner and his wife Frances had three children.  He had further children including a daughter Anne, who wrote about the relationship between Warner and her mother (when he was not married) in the book 'The Blind Horse of Corfu'.

Works

Novels
 The Wild Goose Chase (1937)
 The Professor (1938)
 The Aerodrome (1941)
 Why Was I Killed? (1943) (US title: Return of the Traveller (1944))
 Men of Stones; A melodrama (1949)
 Escapade (1953)
 Young Caesar (1958)
 Imperial Caesar (1960)
 Pericles the Athenian (1963)
 The Converts (1967)

Collections of Poems
 Poems (1937)
 Poems and Contradictions (1945)
 New Poems 1954 (with Laurie Lee and Christopher Hassall) (1954)

Non-fiction
 The Kite (1936)
 We're Not Going To Do Nothing: A Reply to Mr Aldous Huxley's Pamphlet "What Are You Going to Do About It?" (1936); (with Cecil Day-Lewis)
 English Public Schools (1945)
 The Cult of Power (1946)
 John Milton (1949)
 E. M. Forster (1950, 2nd edition 1960) (with John Morris)
 Men and Gods (1950)
 Greeks and Trojans (1951)
 Views of Attica (1951)
 Ashes to Ashes: A Post-Mortem on the 1940–51 Tests (1951) (with Lyle Blair);
 Eternal Greece (1953) with Martin Hürlimann
 Athens (1956) with Martin Hürlimann
 The Greek Philosophers (1958)
 Look at Birds (1962)
 The Stories of the Greeks (1967)
 Athens at War (1970) a "retelling" of Thucydides' history of the Peloponnesian War
 Men of Athens: The Story of Fifth-Century Athens (vt. The Story of Fifth-Century Athens) (1972) (with photographs by Dimitrios Harissiadis)

Translations from Ancient Greek
 Aeschylus, Prometheus Bound (1947)
 Thucydides, History of the Peloponnesian War (1954)
 Xenophon, A History of My Time and The Persian Expedition
 Plutarch, Parallel Lives (as The Fall of the Roman Republic) and Moral Essays
 Euripides, Medea (1944)
 Euripides, Helen (1958)
 Euripides, Hippolytus (1958)

Translations from Latin
 War Commentaries of Caesar (1960) Gallic & Civil Wars
 The Confessions of St. Augustine (1963)

Translation from Modern Greek
 On the Greek Style: Selected Essays in Poetry and Hellenism by George Seferis, translated by Rex Warner and T. D. Frangopoulos, with an introduction by Rex Warner. (1967)

As editor
 The Pilgrim's Progress by John Bunyan, (1951)
 Look Up at the Skies: Poems and Prose Chosen by Rex Warner (a selection of verse by Gerard Manley Hopkins, illustrated by Yvonne Skargon) (1972)

Film and TV adaptations
In 1983 the BBC screened an adaptation of The Aerodrome. It was written by Robin Chapman and directed by Giles Foster. The cast included Peter Firth as Roy, the protagonist, Richard Briers as the Rector and Jill Bennett as Eustasia.

References

Further reading
 Politics in the Novels of Rex Warner (1974) James Flynn
 The Novels of Rex Warner: An Introduction (1989)  N. H. Reeve
 Fiercer Than Tigers: The Life and Works of Rex Warner (2002) Stephen E. Tabachnick

External links
 
 "Forgotten Authors No 59: Rex Warner" by Christopher Fowler, The Independent, 14 November 2010
 Review of The Aerodrome at TrashFiction.co.uk
 Papers Pertaining to Rex Warner, MSS 6251; 20th Century Western and Mormon Americana; L. Tom Perry Special Collections, Harold B. Lee Library, Brigham Young University
 

1905 births
1986 deaths
People from Birmingham, West Midlands
People from Gloucestershire
Bowdoin College faculty
English historical novelists
English science fiction writers
English Christians
James Tait Black Memorial Prize recipients
English anti-fascists
20th-century English novelists
20th-century English poets
Writers of historical fiction set in antiquity